The Ford Idaho Center is a complex of sports and entertainment venues in Nampa, Idaho, approximately  west of Boise.

About
The Ford Idaho Center Arena is best known for rodeo. It annually hosts the Snake River Stampede, considered one of the nation's top rodeos, during the third week in July. The Stampede moved indoors to the Ford Arena in 1997; it was formerly held in an outdoor stadium (now demolished) near Lakeview Park. Since 1999, the Professional Bull Riders (PBR) has hosted a Built Ford Tough Series (originally Bud Light Cup) event at the Ford Idaho Center in what has been a major stop of the tour.

Ford Arena is used for concerts, trade shows, sporting events, and other events. It is the former home of the Idaho Stampede, then of the Continental Basketball Association from 1997 to 2005 and the Idaho Stallions of the now defunct Indoor Professional Football League in their inaugural season of 1999.  
Ford Arena is the former home of the NAIA Division II men's basketball tournament. Upon its completion, the tournament moved to the Ford Idaho Center in 1998 from its former home on the campus of Northwest Nazarene University.  The tournament moved in 2000 when NNU left the NAIA to join the NCAA in Division II.

History 
In March 2004, the Ford Idaho Center Arena was the home court for the Boise State men's basketball team for a second-round matchup in the NIT against the UWM Panthers. The game was moved to the Ford Idaho Center due to a prior scheduled Metallica concert at Boise State's Taco Bell Arena. The game drew a crowd of 10,153, the largest for a basketball game in the arena's history. BSU and Idaho played a non-conference basketball game at the arena on December 31, 2011; the Broncos won 76-73 before 7,540 spectators.

The amphitheater opened on June 15, 1998 with a concert by country music legend Shania Twain during her Come On Over Tour. Since then, it has held concerts by musicians such as Tim McGraw, Bob Dylan, Ben Harper, Jack Johnson and James Taylor.

The Ford Amphitheater has played host to music festivals, including the Vans Warped Tour, the Gigantour, Lilith Fair, and the Mayhem Festival.

Pearl Jam performed during their Binaural Tour on November 3, 2000, with Supergrass as their opening act. The show was filmed and later released as a live album, titled 11/3/00 – Boise, Idaho.

The Rolling Stones played their first concert in the state of Idaho at the arena during their A Bigger Bang Tour on Tuesday, November 14, 2006.

Since its opening, the Ford Idaho Center has been the Treasure Valley stop for the Ringling Brothers and Barnum and Bailey Circus, Disney on Ice and Champions on Ice.

On January 14, 2014, the City of Nampa announced Ford as the new title sponsor for the Idaho Center. As part of the deal, Ford will pay the city $1 million over five years.

On July 14, 2016, rising pop star Meghan Trainor performed at the Ford Amphitheater with opening acts Hailee Steinfeld and Common Kings during her third headlining concert tour, The Untouchable Tour. Later that month, on July 26, 2016, Korn and Rob Zombie headlined the amphitheater during their joint tour, Return of the Dreads Tour.

In 2017, it was announced that the Idaho Horsemen indoor football team would begin play in 2019.

Iconic rock bands Blondie and Garbage teamed up for a joint tour and played the Ford Amphitheater on July 14, 2017, during the Rage and Rapture Tour. John Doe and Exene Cervenka served as supporting acts.

Seattle bands that have played the Ford venues include Heart in '03, Pearl Jam in 2000, Alice in Chains in '13, Foo Fighters in '17, and Death Cab for Cutie in '21.

Venues
Ford Arena 
Ford Amphitheater : 10,500
Ford Sports Park
Ford Idaho Horse Park 
Additionally, the Ford Idaho Horse Park is used for horse shows and the Ford Sports Center is utilized for indoor track and field events, including the home meets of the Boise State University Broncos track teams. It features a 200-meter indoor track and hosted the 2012 NCAA Indoor Track Championships.

See also
 List of contemporary amphitheatres
List of music venues

References

External links
Ford Idaho Center website
Idaho Center Visitors Reviews

Indoor arenas in Idaho
Sports in Boise, Idaho
Convention centers in Idaho
Amphitheaters in the United States
Sports venues in Idaho
Buildings and structures in Canyon County, Idaho
Nampa, Idaho
Tourist attractions in Canyon County, Idaho
Continental Basketball Association venues
1997 establishments in Idaho
Sports venues completed in 1997
Basketball venues in Idaho